Charles William Lutenberg (October 4, 1864 – December 24, 1938) was a Major League Baseball first baseman who played with the Louisville Colonels in 1894. His minor league career lasted through 1897.

External links
  Baseball-Reference

1864 births
1938 deaths
Sportspeople from Quincy, Illinois
Louisville Colonels players
19th-century baseball players
Major League Baseball first basemen
Baseball players from Illinois
Quincy Black Birds players
London Tecumsehs (baseball) players
Evansville Hoosiers players
Quincy Ravens players
Mobile Blackbirds players
Memphis Giants players
Toronto Canucks players
Toronto Canadians players
Albany Senators players
Quincy Little Giants players
Richmond Bluebirds players
Allentown Peanuts players
Rockford Rough Riders players